Cody Joe Harris (born August 16, 1983) is a Republican member of the Texas House of Representatives for District 8.

Political career
Harris won the Republican primary against Thomas McNutt by a margin of 57% to 43%.

Harris won the general election on November 6, 2018, against Democrat Wesley Ratcliff 78.2% to 21.8%.

References

Republican Party members of the Texas House of Representatives
Living people
21st-century American politicians
People from Tyler, Texas
People from Palestine, Texas
Texas A&M University alumni
Businesspeople from Texas
1983 births